Todd Eaton Warriner (born January 3, 1974) is a Canadian former professional ice hockey forward. Over the course of his career, Warriner played for the Toronto Maple Leafs, Tampa Bay Lightning, Phoenix Coyotes, Vancouver Canucks, Philadelphia Flyers, and Nashville Predators of the NHL. He also played for several teams in Europe, including Jokerit of the Finnish SM-liiga, and the Hannover Scorpions and Kölner Haie of the German Deutsche Eishockey Liga.

Playing career
Warriner was drafted by the Quebec Nordiques as their first-round pick, #4 overall, in the 1992 NHL Entry Draft. He did not play for Quebec though. He played for several teams in the NHL, as well as the AHL, OHL, the Finnish SM-liiga and the Swiss league.

Warriner is also notable for having scored the first goal in the history of the then newly opened Air Canada Centre on February 20, 1999 as a member of the home Toronto Maple Leafs. He was a member of the Canadian team that won the 2005 Deutschland Cup.

Career statistics

Regular season and playoffs

International

Broadcasting career 
Beginning in the 2012-13 season, Warriner became a colour commentator for TVCogeco's coverage of the Windsor Spitfires.
As of 2015, Warriner is a commentator for Sportsnet.

References

External links
 

1974 births
Battle of the Blades participants
Canadian ice hockey left wingers
Cornwall Aces players
HC Forward-Morges players
Hannover Scorpions players
Ice hockey people from Ontario
Ice hockey players at the 1994 Winter Olympics
Jokerit players
Kitchener Rangers players
Kölner Haie players
Living people
Manitoba Moose players
Medalists at the 1994 Winter Olympics
National Hockey League first-round draft picks
Olympic ice hockey players of Canada
Olympic medalists in ice hockey
Olympic silver medalists for Canada
Philadelphia Flyers players
Phoenix Coyotes players
Quebec Nordiques draft picks
St. John's Maple Leafs players
Sportspeople from Chatham-Kent
Springfield Falcons players
Tampa Bay Lightning players
Toronto Maple Leafs players
Vancouver Canucks players
Windsor Spitfires players
Nashville Predators players
Canadian expatriate ice hockey players in Finland
Canadian expatriate ice hockey players in Germany